The Collo massif, sometimes called Kabylie de Collo, is a mountainous forest massif of Algeria located in the north-east of the country and constituting part of the Tell Atlas.

Geography 
Geographers distinguish several "Kabylies": Great Kabylie, Small Kabylie and Kabylie of Collo or Numidic Kabylies. The climate is humid Mediterranean.

The Collo Massif, a segment of the Tell Atlas, is heavily forested. Lying between the Skikda Valley in the east and the Rhumel River in the west and strongly advancing towards the Mediterranean Sea: the Cap Bougaroûn, is the northernmost point of Algeria.

Population 
The population of the Collo massif was a peasant society in the full sense of the term: a complete sedentary lifestyle, a strong attachment to the land, a careful development. Its social structure was strong, governed by customary rules, the land was privatized with status melk.

The Collo massif is, like the Small Kabylie and the Edough, populated by Arabized Berbers long-time but leading a sedentary life. The mountain people practice cattle breeding. Goats and sheep provided supplements (milk, flesh and hair) to poor agriculture. Demographic densities are significantly lower than those of the Grande and Petite Kabylies.

References 

Landforms of Algeria